The Cathedral of Hope  (CoH), a member congregation of the United Church of Christ, is an historically and predominantly LGBT congregation located in the Oak Lawn area of Dallas, Texas, in the United States. The Dallas Cathedral of Hope is said to be the world's largest inclusive "liberal Christian church with a primary outreach to lesbian, gay, bisexual and transgender persons", with a membership of over 4,000 local members.

The postmodern cathedral was designed by Philip Cortelyou Johnson and has not been built yet, even after it was revised five times from the first design by the architect at the request of the Rev. Michael Piazza, then dean of the cathedral. Donald Bruce Kaufman was consulted for the painting of the exterior. The building is ten stories high and complemented with a 78-foot bell tower commemoration of HIV/AIDS victims. The physical building is symbolic to the liberal Christian faith that hosts and is found in a considerably conservative area. The main building was completed in 2002, at a construction cost of approximately $20 million, and can accommodate up to 2,200 worshippers at once. Piazza was the senior pastor for nearly twenty years between the late 1980s and 1990s. He oversaw the largest growth in the church's history, from 250 members to more than 3,000, while ministering through the AIDS crisis.

Other campuses are located in Mid-Cities (between Dallas and Fort Worth), and Oklahoma City. Its national outreach program reaches a further online audience nationwide. The Cathedral of Hope joined the United Church of Christ in February 2007, having previously been the flagship congregation of the Universal Fellowship of Metropolitan Community Churches. In November 2009, construction was commenced on the Cathedral of Hope's Interfaith Peace Chapel, designed by the prominent architect Philip Johnson (Alan Ritchie Architects). Dedication of the building was on November 7, 2010. The Rev. Dr. Neil Cazares-Thomas has been the cathedral's senior pastor since May 2015.

History

On July 30, 1970, a group of twelve people gathered at a home at 4612 Victor Street in Dallas to discuss establishing a Metropolitan Community Church congregation. In May 1971, Richard Vincent was elected as the first pastor of MCC-Dallas. The group worshiped in homes for the first year and a half, using a coffee table as an altar.

In 1972, MCC-Dallas moved into its first church home at 3834 Ross Avenue. The building had been originally built as a small private hospital in the 1920s. In 1974, James Harris was elected as the church's second pastor.
On October 4, 1976, MCC-Dallas purchased a former Church of Christ building at 2701 Regan, Dallas.

In November 1977, Don Eastman was elected as the church's third pastor. At this time, the membership had grown to almost 400. Michael Piazza was elected senior pastor in November 1987 bringing in new members attracted by Piazza's preaching. Membership grew to 600.

In late 1990, MCC-Dallas became the Cathedral of Hope MCC to reflect a new broader mission to reach out LGBT people everywhere with a message of hope. The church began its "Pink-Period" quest to build a larger church to accommodate a growing congregation. This new home was completed in 1992. That same year, the Christmas Eve service was broadcast on CNN. The congregation now approached 1,000 members. During 1993 the cathedral grows by a record 300 members.

The Cathedral of Hope in 1995 commissioned the prominent architect Philip Johnson to design a new cathedral campus.

Membership grew to over 2,300 by 1998 and the cathedral served a rapidly growing congregation of more than 3,000. In 1999, CoH-TV begins hosting live Internet worship services via the cathedral's website.

In 2000, the Cathedral of Hope began the "Century of Compassion" by donating more than one million dollars in direct assistance and volunteer community support annually. On July 30, 2000, the John Thomas Bell Wall, a National AIDS Memorial, was dedicated. The church saw more than 1,500 AIDS funerals and memorial services.

On August 6, 2000, nearly 100 people attended the inaugural worship service at the Cathedral of Hope – Oklahoma City.

On July 28, 2002, the newly completed  Congregational Life Center was dedicated. It featured new classrooms for children and youth, renovated office space for the Hope Counseling Center and expanded office space for cathedral staff. The close of 2002 saw a local and national membership of nearly 4,000.

In 2003, a group calling themselves the Cathedral of Hope Reform was formed, led by church member Terri Frey. In April 2003, Frey filed a complaint with MCC that prompted the Universal Fellowship of Metropolitan Community Churches to open an investigation against Michael Piazza. In July 2003, believing the investigators had overstepped their bounds, the church's board called for a vote to disaffiliate from the denomination, which passed with 88 percent support, effectively ending the UFMCC investigation. Piazza took a three-month sabbatical after the vote. Half of those who voted to remain affiliated with the MCC denomination formed their own church known as MCC of Greater Dallas with pastor Cindi Love.

On February 6, 2005, Jo Hudson was elected as senior pastor of the Cathedral of Hope. Michael Piazza became dean of the cathedral. In 2005, the church celebrated 35 years of ministry and activism. It launched a capital campaign to build the next phase of Philip Johnson's campus design, an interfaith peace chapel. The church launched a new non-profit organization, Hope for Peace & Justice, with Michael Piazza as president.

In October 2006, the Cathedral of Hope was granted standing by the North Texas Association of the United Church of Christ (UCC) as a member congregation, becoming the fourth largest congregation in the denomination.

The Cathedral of Hope's Interfaith Peace Chapel began construction in 2009 and was completed in November 2010.

In July 2010 the Cathedral of Hope's 4000 members celebrated its 40th anniversary.

Jo Hudson resigned to pursue other ministry opportunities on May 19, 2013. Jim Mitulski became the interim senior pastor on August 1.

After a year long search process, Neil Cazares-Thomas became the new pastor on May 24, 2015, after active service in the Metropolitan Community Church of Bournemouth, England, and Founders MCC, Los Angeles.

In July 2015, the Cathedral of Hope celebrated its 45th anniversary. In 2019, the Houston campus, led by Lester Jackson, merged with St. Peter Lutheran Church (a historically German-speaking congregation) to become St. Peter United Church of Christ.

Pastors
 1971–1974: Richard Vincent
 1974–1977: James Harris
 1977–1987: Don Eastman
 1987–2003: Michael S. Piazza
 2005–2013: Jo Hudson
 2013–2014: Jim Mitulski
 2015–present: Neil Cazares-Thomas

Charity work
The main Dallas congregation is involved in multiple charitable programs through its Dallas Hope Charities initiative. iCare is a program utilizing volunteers who serve lunch to the needy each Monday, as well as giving out donated food, toiletries, and sundries from the cathedral's food pantry to those who are also in need, in conjunction with the lunch. BACH (Breakfast at Cathedral of Hope) is a weekly breakfast served to the needy each Saturday morning. On several occasions, the iCare and BACH meals are accompanied by haircutting and also medical testing of vital signs by a visiting medical professional. A monthly Pack the Pantry night on the last Sunday of the month occurs when volunteers gather for collection and organization of donated food items for the cathedral's food pantry.

Columbarium
Cathedral of Hope provides niche spaces for church members in the event of their death, if they so choose, at an on-site columbarium. Church members can elect not to take advantage of this service, but are remembered upon their deaths with their name displayed on a side wall of the columbarium area.

See also
 List of Christian denominations affirming LGBT

References

External links
 
 Interfaith Peace Chapel website
 Cathedral of Hope Columbarium at Find A Grave

Churches in Dallas
LGBT churches in the United States
Christian organizations established in 1970
Metropolitan Community Churches
United Church of Christ churches
Cathedrals in Texas
LGBT in Texas
1970 establishments in Texas
Protestant cathedrals in the United States